Sergei Martynov (new transliteration Siarhei Martynau, Łacinka Siarhiej Anatolevič Martynaŭ) (born 18 May 1968) is a Belarusian 50 m rifle shooter. He is the 2012 Olympic champion in the 50 m rifle prone event.

Life and career 
Martynov was born in Vereya, Naro-Fominsky District, Moscow Oblast, Russian SFSR. Although a world-class competitor in the three positions event, he achieved his greatest successes in the prone event. He won bronze medals in the 50 m rifle prone events at the 2000 Summer Olympics in Sydney and 2004 Summer Olympics in Athens.

Martynov won gold at the 2006 ISSF World Shooting Championships. He also has numerous victories in ISSF World Cups and World Cup Finals. He has reached the maximum score of 600 points six times in competition, more than any other shooter.

In 2012, at age 44, he was awarded his first Olympic gold medal, winning the 50 m rifle prone event at the 2012 Summer Olympics in London.

Olympic results

Records

References

External links 

 Martynov's profile at ISSF NEWS

1968 births
Living people
Belarusian male sport shooters
Olympic shooters of Belarus
Olympic shooters of the Soviet Union
ISSF rifle shooters
World record holders in shooting
Shooters at the 1988 Summer Olympics
Shooters at the 1996 Summer Olympics
Shooters at the 2000 Summer Olympics
Shooters at the 2004 Summer Olympics
Shooters at the 2008 Summer Olympics
Shooters at the 2012 Summer Olympics
Olympic bronze medalists for Belarus
Olympic gold medalists for Belarus
Olympic medalists in shooting
Medalists at the 2012 Summer Olympics
Medalists at the 2004 Summer Olympics
Shooters at the 2015 European Games
European Games bronze medalists for Belarus
European Games medalists in shooting
Medalists at the 2000 Summer Olympics
Russian emigrants to Belarus
People from Naro-Fominsky District